Canada Reads is an annual "battle of the books" competition organized and broadcast by Canada's public broadcaster, the CBC.

The English edition has aired each year since 2002, while the French edition aired annually from 2004 to 2014, and was then discontinued until being revived in 2018.

In 2021, sister service CBC Music launched Canada Listens, which used a similar format of advocates debating five classic albums by Canadian musicians.

Overview
During Canada Reads, five personalities champion five different books, each champion extolling the merits of one of the titles. The debate is broadcast over a series of five programs. At the end of each episode, the panelists vote one title out of the competition until only one book remains. This book is then billed as the book that all of Canada should read.

CBC Radio producer, Peter Kavanagh, proposed the general idea of a national radio book campaign during the fall of 2001. Later that year, Talin Vartanian conceived Canada Reads and created the essential structure of the program: an annual campaign to select a book for the nation to read. She proposed the idea of five panelists, each championing a different title in a national on air debate. Vartanian was producer in the first edition (with Kavanagh), then she became executive producer from 2002 to 2007. In 2007 the program was an "All Star Edition", a reunion of the winning panelists from the first five years. From 2007 to 2017, Ann Jansen produced the program.

Canada Reads was first broadcast on CBC's Radio One in 2002, and has aired annually on radio since then. The third and fourth editions also were broadcast on television, on CBC Newsworld. Broadcast dates were February 16 to February 20, 2004, and February 21 to February 25, 2005, respectively. The seventh edition was also broadcast on Bold TV, broadcasting from February 25 to February 29. Beginning with the third edition, the daily debates could be heard online as well as on Radio One. The fifth edition was broadcast from April 17 to April 21, 2006. The sixth edition aired February 25 to March 2, 2007. The seventh edition of Canada Reads was broadcast on February 25 to February 29, 2008, and for the first time, it was available as a podcast.

The books in the running for each edition of Canada Reads are announced several months before the programs are broadcast. Titles must be Canadian fiction, poetry or plays. They are promoted in bookstores, in the hope that the Canada Reads audience will purchase and read them all before the programs air. In some cases, publishers have published special editions of the nominated titles.

The publisher of the winning Canada Reads title donates a portion of sales proceeds from the winning book to a charitable organization working in the field of literacy. Recipients have included Frontier College, the Movement for Canadian Literacy, ABC Life Literacy Canada (formerly ABC CANADA Literacy Foundation) and Laubach Literacy of Canada.

Beginning in 2004, Radio-Canada, the French-language service of CBC, produced a French version of Canada Reads entitled Le Combat des livres ("Battle of the books"). It was broadcast on Première Chaîne until 2014, following which it was discontinued for three years until being revived in 2018.

Both the English and French programs sometimes, but not always, include one personality more commonly associated with the other language community, who champions a translated work. One advocate, Maureen McTeer,  has appeared on both programs in the same year, championing the same novel in both its original English and translated French editions. Several other novels have also been chosen for both programs, although their English and French versions were not chosen by the same advocate or in the same year; one novel to date, Lawrence Hill's The Book of Negroes (French title Aminata) has won both competitions.

2002
Canada Reads 2002 aired from April 16 to 19, 2002. The winning title was announced on April 23, 2002, Canada Book Day. Mary Walsh was the moderator.

2003
Canada Reads 2003 aired from April 21 to 25, 2003. Bill Richardson was the moderator.

2004
Canada Reads 2004 aired on both CBC Radio and CBC Newsworld from February 16 to 20, 2004. Bill Richardson was the moderator.

2005
Canada Reads 2005 was broadcast from February 21 to 25, 2005. Bill Richardson was again the moderator.

2006
Canada Reads 2006 was broadcast from April 17 to 21, 2006. Bill Richardson was again the moderator.

2007
Canada Reads 2007 aired from February 26 to March 2, 2007. Bill Richardson again moderated the competition. For the 2007 competition, each of the five winning advocates from past series returned to champion a new book in an "all-star" edition of the series.

2008
Canada Reads 2008 aired from February 25 to 29, 2008. Jian Ghomeshi moderated the competition.

2009
Canada Reads 2009 aired from March 2 to 6, 2009. Jian Ghomeshi moderated the competition.

2010
Canada Reads 2010 aired from March 8 to 12, 2010. Jian Ghomeshi moderated the competition.

2011
Canada Reads 2011 aired from February 7 to 10, 2011. The producers announced a slightly different format for the 2011 contest. Throughout the month of October 2010, an online vote was held to determine the books that listeners consider the 40 "most essential" Canadian novels of the past decade, and the panelists made their choices from within that list. Only novels, not short story collections, were eligible; however, novels which have previously been included in a Canada Reads competition were still eligible for renomination.

2012
The books for this edition were all non-fiction. A list of 40 non-fiction books were announced as being the shortlist finalists in October 2011, including And No Birds Sang by Farley Mowat, Shake Hands with the Devil by Romeo Dallaire, The Last Spike by Pierre Berton, The Death and Life of Great American Cities by Jane Jacobs and Paris 1919 by Margaret MacMillan. Listeners could vote on up to five books they wanted to be shortlisted. The debates aired from February 6 to 9, 2012. Jian Ghomeshi moderated the competition.

On the first day of discussions, panelist Anne-France Goldwater "caused shock and outrage among literary types" (according to The Globe and Mail) by calling Carmen Aguirre "a bloody terrorist" and alleging that Marina Nemat "tells a story that's not true". In response, Marina Nemat posted on Facebook, "I hope [Goldwater] can produce evidence to back up her claims. If not, I would like to receive a public apology from her." Nemat's Prisoner of Tehran was the first voted off, with Stacey McKenzie casting a tie-breaking vote. Arlene Dickinson (the panelist defending Prisoner of Tehran) called McKenzie's vote "the wrong choice for the wrong reason".

2013
The theme for 2013 was "Turf Wars", with the advocates and titles chosen to each represent one of Canada's major geographic regions (British Columbia, the Prairies, Ontario, Quebec and the Atlantic provinces). The books and panelists for 2013 were revealed on November 29, 2012, on Q. The debates ran from February 11 to 14, 2013.

2014
The theme for this year was "A Novel to Change Our Nation." Books and panelists were revealed on November 27, 2013, on Q. Jian Ghomeshi moderated the competition.

2015
The 2015 edition of Canada Reads was moderated by Wab Kinew, with the theme of the discussions being "One Book to Break Barriers". The panelists and titles were announced on January 20, 2015, with the debates taking place from March 16 to 19.

2016
The 2016 edition of Canada Reads was moderated by Gill Deacon, and conducted on theme of "Starting Over". Panelists and titles were announced on January 20, 2016, with the debates taking place from March 21 to 24.

2017
The 2017 edition of Canada Reads was moderated by Ali Hassan, on the theme of "The Book Canadians Need Now". Panelists and titles were announced on January 31, 2017, and the debates took place from March 27 to 30.

Note: Tamara Taylor was originally announced as advocate for Company Town but had to withdraw due to a conflict with the filming schedule of her Netflix series Altered Carbon. Measha Brueggergosman was announced as Taylor's replacement on March 9, 2017.

2018
The 2018 edition of Canada Reads was moderated by Ali Hassan, on the theme of "One Book to Open Your Eyes". Panelists and titles were announced on January 30, 2018, and the debates took place from March 26 to 29.

2019
The 2019 edition of Canada Reads was moderated by Ali Hassan on the theme "One Book to Move You". The books and panelists were announced on January 31, 2019, with the debates taking place from March 25 to 28.

2020
The 2020 edition of Canada Reads was moderated by Ali Hassan on the theme "One Book to Bring Canada into Focus". The books and panelists were announced on January 22, 2020. The debates were originally slated to take place from March 16 to 19; however, as the debates normally take place in a theatre in front of a live audience, they were postponed to a later date in light of the COVID-19 pandemic in Canada. In the interim, the CBC produced a series of five specials, one profiling each of the five nominated books through interviews with both the writer and the advocate, to air in place of the original debates.

In July, it was announced that the debates would take place in the week of July 20 to 23.

2021

The 2021 debates took place in the week of March 8 to 11, 2021, moderated by Ali Hassan on the theme of "One Book to Transport Us".

Canada Listens
Also in 2021, CBC Music announced Canada Listens, a debate which applied the Canada Reads format to five albums by Canadian musicians. Hosted by Saroja Coelho and broadcast on Mornings, the Canada Listens debates took place in the week of April 12 to 15.

2022
The 2022 debates took place during the week of March 28 to 31, 2022, moderated by Ali Hassan on the theme of "One Book to Connect Us".

Canada Listens
The second Canada Listens debates were hosted by Saroja Coelho on CBC Music's Mornings from April 11 to April 14. It resulted in the first tie in the history of the Canada Reads franchise, with two albums jointly winning the final vote.

2023
The 2023 debates are slated to take place from March 27 to March 30, moderated by Ali Hassan on the theme of "One Book to Shift Your Perspective".<ref>"Meet the Canada Reads 2023 contenders". CBC Books, January 25, 2023.</ref>

Success
As a vehicle to promote interest in reading and books and to increase sales, Canada Reads has been a signal success. Even already successful titles see increases in sales driven by their inclusion in the contest: sales of Michael Ondaatje's In the Skin of a Lion increased by 80,000 in 2002, the year of its appearance on Canada Reads. Its publisher, Random House of Canada attributed much of this increase to Canada Reads.

The success for lesser known titles can be as marked. Hubert Aquin's Next Episode sold 18,500 copies in the year when it won Canada Reads.

For the 2005 edition, sales of Jacques Poulin's Volkswagen Blues, which usually are about 200 copies a year, increased to 7,500 between the time the nominations were announced and the shows began airing. During the same period, 7,000 copies of Frank Parker Day's Rockbound were shipped by its publisher, the University of Toronto Press.

Criticism
There has been some criticism of Canada Reads''. First, criticism has been made of the use of "celebrity" panelists. In 2007, a listener named John Mutford unsuccessfully attempted to become the first non-celebrity panelist. Critics have also taken issue with the game show format, and have contended that discussion of the books has often remained on a superficial level.

The choice of books has also been criticized. Originally each panelist provided a list of five books, from which the producers chose the final contenders. In 2005, this process changed, and each panelist submitted only one choice. Due to scheduling problems, Rufus Wainwright was not able to appear after selecting his choice, and singer Molly Johnson was chosen to defend his chosen book.

References

External links
Canada Reads web site

Canadian literature
CBC Radio One programs
CBC Television original programming
2000s Canadian reality television series
2002 radio programme debuts
2004 Canadian television series debuts
Television shows about books and literature